Ränilinn (Estonian for "Silicon Town") is a neighbourhood of Tartu, Estonia.

See also
Lõunakeskus
Institute of Physics, University of Tartu

References

Tartu